The Ruijū Karin (類聚歌林) was a Japanese waka anthology compiled by Yamanoue no Okura.

Compilation and date 
The Ruijū Karin was compiled by Yamanoue no Okura. It was likely compiled after Yōrō 5 (721) when Okura become a tutor to the crown prince (later Emperor Shōmu).

Title 
The work's title has been translated into English as:
The Grove of Poetry, Arranged by Topic
Forest of Classified Verse
Forest of Classified Verses
The Grove of Poems Classified
Classified Forest of Poetry
Classified Forest of Verse

Status and apparent contents 
The work is now lost.

It apparently survived until around the end of the Heian period. The late-Heian books of poetic criticism  and  record that copies of it were in the holdings of Byōdō-in and/or Hōjō-ji), and in addition to these works it was also mentioned in a diary entry from 1015 (永承五年四月二十六日前麗景殿女御延子歌絵合, 正子内親王絵合), Ōgishō (奥義抄), Fujiwara no Shunzei's , Waka Genzaisho Mokuroku (和歌現在書目録), but none of these works quote it directly.

Its contents are now known only from nine fragmentary passages quoted in books I, II and IX the Man'yōshū, as a source of information poets and the circumstances of composition of poems, and its full contents are unknown.

The work divided poems into categories based on some sort of criteria and, using resources such as the Nihon Shoki and Fudoki, investigated the circumstances under which its poems were composed. As far as the Man'yōshū tells us, it apparently included poems by emperors and members of the imperial family, as well as court poems such as those commemorating imperial processions to various parts of the country (行幸従駕 gyōkō-jūga). This has led to the theory that it was compiled to be presented to the crown prince.

It may have been modeled on the Chinese work Yiwen Leiju.

References

Citations

Works cited 

 
 
 

Nara-period works
Lost poems
Shisenshū
Yamanoue no Okura